Sachalin may refer to the following villages:

 Sachalin, Lublin Voivodeship (east Poland)
 Sachalin, Świętokrzyskie Voivodeship (south-central Poland)
 Sachalin (Piotrków Pierwszy), a village in Lublin County, Lublin Voivodeship, in eastern Poland

For the Russian (ex-Japanese) island, see Sakhalin.